The 1964 UCLA Bruins football team was an American football team that represented the University of California, Los Angeles during the 1964 NCAA University Division football season.  In their seventh and final year under head coach Bill Barnes, the Bruins compiled a 4–6 record (2–2 AAWU) and finished in fourth place in the Athletic Association of Western Universities.

UCLA's offensive leaders in 1964 were quarterback Larry Zeno with 1,363 passing yards and 325 rushing yards, and Mike Haffner with 515 receiving yards.

A month after the season, Barnes resigned as head coach in December, and was succeeded by Tommy Prothro, head coach at eighth-ranked Oregon State for ten seasons and a former UCLA assistant.

Schedule

References

UCLA
UCLA Bruins football seasons
UCLA Bruins football
UCLA Bruins football